Alexandros Konstantinidis (born 3 November 1988) is a Greek footballer currently playing for Panserraikos.

Club career
Konstantinidis began his career with Panathinaikos and played in season 2007/2008 on loan for Koropi F.C. He turned back in July 2008 to Panathinaikos FC and played for the team until June 2008, before signed in August for Apollon Smyrni F.C. After one year with Apollon Smyrni F.C. was in summer 2009 released and signed after a difficult trial with Ruch Chorzow, for Panserraikos who scored his first goal for his new team on 15 November 2009.

International career
Konstantinidis is former member of the Greece national under-21 football team.

References

External links
 
 Konstantinidis :: Alexandros Konstantinidis :: ogol.com.br
 Onsports.gr Profile
 Myplayer.gr Profile

1988 births
Living people
Citizens of Greece through descent
Greek footballers
Panathinaikos F.C. players
Super League Greece players
Borussia Dortmund players
German people of Greek descent
Sportspeople of Greek descent
Association football midfielders
Footballers from Dortmund